The Oanțu is a right tributary of the river Bistrița in Romania. It discharges into the Pângărați Reservoir near the village Oanțu.

References

Rivers of Romania
Rivers of Neamț County